Tetracha lateralis is a species of tiger beetle that was described by W. Horn in 1905.

References

Beetles described in 1905
Cicindelidae